Risto Korhonen (born 27 November 1986) is a Finnish former professional ice hockey defenceman who played for HPK of the Finnish Liiga. He was selected in the fifth round, 159th overall, by the Carolina Hurricanes in the 2005 NHL Entry Draft.

References

External links
 

1986 births
Living people
Carolina Hurricanes draft picks
Finnish ice hockey defencemen
HPK players
Lempäälän Kisa players
People from Sotkamo
Sportspeople from Kainuu